General elections were held in Morocco on 7 October 2016. The ruling Justice and Development Party remained the largest party, winning 125 of the 395 seats in the House of Representatives, a gain of 18 seats compared to the 2011 elections.

Saadeddine Othmani was appointed as Prime Minister by King Mohammed VI and formed his cabinet on 5 April 2017, including the PJD, the National Rally of Independents (RNI), the Popular Movement (MP), the Constitutional Union (UC), the Party of Progress and Socialism (PPS) and the Socialist Union of Popular Forces (USFP).

Background
The elections were announced by the Moroccan government in late January 2016. They were the second elections after the constitutional reforms introduced in 2011 by King Mohammed VI in response to the Arab Spring. Despite the reforms, most executive powers still lie with the king.

The 2011 elections were won by the Justice and Development Party (PJD), which has led the government since then. The party is described as "moderate Islamist", but its government coalition included parties with differing ideologies.

The incumbent Prime Minister going into the 2016 elections was Abdelilah Benkirane. The largest opposition party was the pro-monarchy Party of Authenticity and Modernity (PAM). PJD and PAM ran an "unusually hostile" campaign. The largest Islamist opposition group, Justice and Spirituality, as well as several left-wing organizations boycotted the election, protesting the monarchy's still considerable executive powers.

Electoral system
The 395 seats in the House of Representatives are elected by proportional representation in two tiers: 305 seats are elected from 92 multi-member constituencies, with the electoral threshold set at 6%, and the remaining 90 seats are elected from a single nationwide constituency with the electoral threshold set at 3%. The nationwide seats are reserved, with 60 for women and 30 for people under the age of 40.

Under the electoral system no party can win a majority in the parliament, and parties must form a coalition government.

Results
The vote had 43% turnout. The Justice and Development Party won the most votes and 125 out of the 395 seats. The Authenticity and Modernity Party won 102 seats, and the rest of the seats were split among smaller parties.

Reactions
Morocco's election observer body said that the voting was largely free and fair. It reported some cases of vote-buying, but said that they were rare and sporadic. It also expressed concern about the relatively low (43%) turnout. Critics also alleged that the royal establishment used its influence to favour the pro-monarchy PAM.

Aftermath
Following the elections, Khalid Adnoun, a spokesman for the second-placed Authenticity and Modernity Party (PAM) ruled out joining a coalition government, forcing the PJD to partner with multiple smaller parties in order to secure a majority. On 10 October, Abdelillah Benkirane was reappointed Prime Minister by King Mohammed VI in accordance with the 2011 constitutional reforms which required the king to appoint a prime minister from the party receiving the most votes. However, plans to form a second coalition government led to a political deadlock due to Benkirane objecting to proposals by Aziz Akhannouch, then-cabinet minister and newly-elected leader of the National Rally of Independents (RNI), and Mohand Laenser of the Popular Movement (MP), calling for the Constitutional Union (UC) and the Socialist Union of Popular Forces (USFP) to be included in the coalition.

On 17 March 2017, Saadeddine Othmani was appointed as Prime Minister by King Mohammed VI. On 25 March 2017 Othmani announced that he would be forming a coalition consisting of the PJD, RNI, MP, UC, USFP, and the Party of Progress and Socialism (PPS). The members of the cabinet were announced by the King on 5 April, with some key portfolios going to technocrats.

References

2016 elections in Africa
2016 in Morocco
2016
October 2016 events in Africa
2016